The women's team pursuit in the 2012–13 ISU Speed Skating World Cup was contested over four races on four occasions, out of a total of nine World Cup occasions for the season, with the first occasion taking place in Heerenveen, Netherlands, on 16–18 November 2012, and the final occasion also taking place in Heerenveen on 8–10 March 2013.

The Netherlands won the cup, while the defending champions, Canada, came second, and Poland came third.

Top three

Race medallists

Standings 
Standings as of 10 March 2013 (end of the season).

References 

Women team pursuit
ISU